Nicholas E. Becker was a member of the Wisconsin State Assembly.

Biography
Becker was born in Luxembourg in 1842. Later, he was married to Otillia Becker. He died in Fredonia, Wisconsin in 1920 and is buried in Dacada, Wisconsin.

Career
Becker was a member of the Assembly twice. First, from 1899 to 1900 and second, from 1903 to 1904. He was a Democrat.

References

External links
The Political Graveyard
Find a Grave

Luxembourgian emigrants to the United States
1842 births
1920 deaths
Burials in Wisconsin
People from Fredonia, Wisconsin
Democratic Party members of the Wisconsin State Assembly